Zala Meršnik (born 7 June 2001) is a Slovenian professional footballer who plays as a goalkeeper for Spanish Primera División club Sporting de Huelva and the Slovenia women's national team.

Career
Meršnik has been capped for the Slovenia national team, appearing for the team during the 2019 FIFA Women's World Cup qualifying cycle.

References

External links
 
 
 

2001 births
Living people
Slovenian women's footballers
Slovenian expatriate sportspeople in Germany
Expatriate women's footballers in Germany
Expatriate women's footballers in Spain
Slovenia women's international footballers
Women's association football goalkeepers
1. FFC Turbine Potsdam players
ŽNK Mura players
Slovenian expatriate footballers
Sporting de Huelva players
Primera División (women) players
Slovenian expatriate sportspeople in Spain